Adélaïde Valentin, also known as Colonel Valentin, was a labourer and communard. She was, during the last month of the Paris Commune, the colonel of the Federated Legion of Women.

Present in political clubs, in particular the one at Saint-Éloi in the 12th arrondissement, from 10 May she directed the Federated Legion of Women, a women's military organization charged with finding deserters.

Few traces of her life have been preserved, with the exception of records of her virulent speeches in the clubs, where she exhorted women to participate in the defence of the Commune. These were remarked upon by her contemporaries, in particular, the anti-communard observer Paul Fontoulieu. Details of her life after the Commune are unknown.

Biography 
Very few details of her life are known, in particular nothing outside of her actions during the Paris Commune.

Communard in the 12th arrondissement 
The beginning of the Franco-Prussian War in the summer of 1870 saw the fall of Napoleon III and the Second Empire, and then the proclamation of the Third Republic on 4 September 1870. On 18 March 1871, in reaction to the capitulation of France in the Armistice of Versailles and the new National Assembly with its monarchist majority, the population of Paris and the National Guard revolted. The Paris Commune was proclaimed on 28 March. Political life was organized around the elected Commune Council and meetings in political clubs, which had already been present before the uprising, and which brought together citizens with similar political opinions in the same neighbourhood. 

The first known mentions of Adélaïde Valentin date to April 1871. She was an active communard who frequented several clubs. 
In the latter, the participation of women was particularly important; 
Council members, local politicians, and officers of the National Guard also attended there, and it became the centre of revolutionary action in the 12th arrondissement.

Before the Legion of Women was formed, a "Committee of Republican Women" had already been created in the arrondissement, supported by the mayor, Jean Fenouillas (known as "Philippe"), in order to reorganize public assistance. Adélaïde Valentin was probably a member of this committee: after the fall of the Commune, another member, Julie Magot, testified before the court martial that Valentin had been involved with the expulsion of nuns from a local charitable institution. This kind of action was among the aims of the Committee of Republican Women. 
Additionally, she may have been Phillipe's mistress.

Delegate of the  

This organization, the most important of the various groups independent of the Commune government, was constituted of committees in each arrondissement, which were joined into a Central Committee. Valentin was one of the seven delegates, all labourers, to the Central Provisional Committee on the foundation on 11 April 1871.

The  demanded organizational assistance and declared its intentions: to restructure women's work and to take part actively in the defence of the city. On 17 April, with Blanche Lefebvre and the citizen known as "Girard", Valentin signed the notice for the third public meeting held on 21 April at Notre-Dame-de-la-Croix de Ménilmontant, where additional delegates for the arrondissement committees were designated.

Colonel of the Federated Legion of Women 

In May 1871, Adélaïde Valentin became colonel of the Federated Legion of Women. This unit, exclusively made up of women, was founded on 10 May by Colonel Jules Montels, on the order of Philippe, the mayor of the 12th arrondissement. The Legion was charged with organizing the search for deserters of the National Guard, an activity that was already being practiced by women before the creation of the Legion. The unit was armed and organized militarily. Witness testimonies put the number of members between 20 and 100. Valentin was chosen to direct the Legion, alongside Captain Louise Neckbecker (or Neibecker, née Keinerknecht, a 28-year-old trim-maker and ambulance nurse), and the standard-bearer, Marie Rogissart.

From 12 May onward, the women marched with the 12th Legion of the National Guard (the 12th arrondissement's unit), according to the account of a Council member, Benoît Malon. Their parades are attested by different witnesses: one testified during Louise Neckbecker's trial that she had been seen in May, "adorned with a red armband, receiving, from the hands of the woman Valentin in front of the town hall, a red flag that she carried to the Hôtel-de-ville, escorted by around 100 other women." Many men testified to having been arrested by the National Guard following denunciation by the women of the Legion. The women were confined to this role: they were not to arrest deserters directly and had to appeal to the men of the National Guard.

There are no direct records of Adélaïde Valentin's actions, but separate witnesses agree on her role. Several of her speeches in clubs during May are known, in which she urged women to join the armed ranks of the Commune, and which witnesses noted for their virulence.

and disappearance 
According to the minutes of the meeting, Valentin encouraged women to join the Federated Legion of Women: she appealed for women to "guard the gates of Paris while the men go to battle." She ended her speech by asking for clothing confiscated from nuns to be redistributed to poor children, and that "the flowers upon the altars, in the chapels, and all around the madonnas, be given to schoolchildren as prizes, to decorate the garrets of the poor." 
The proposition was unanimously accepted. 
A member of the club thanked her and invited her to return, an unusual occurrence that may reflect her status as colonel of the Legion.

After 20 May 1871, Adélaïde Valentin disappears from the historical record. Her actions during  are unknown, as is her life after the Commune, if she even survived the repression.

Representation

Hysterical portrait and reported speeches 
The abbot Paul Fontoulieu described Valentin in his  as "short, fat, red-haired; a fanatic of the worst kind, who can be seen at the opening of all the clubs," 
and "a prostitute". 
Fontoulieu is a generally reliable observer, but an anti-communard one; he paints a hysterical portrait of Valentin by quoting her violent words, such as those at the 16 May session of : "I urge all women to denounce their husbands and make them take up arms. If they refuse, shoot them!" 
An eyewitness reported that an unspecified woman at  had called on women to attack their husbands if they refused to join the army: "I saw [...] a woman climb into the pulpit with a revolver in her hand. She said she would blow her husband's brains out if he didn't want to march and that all women should do the same." 
Fontoulieu attributes similar remarks to Valentin. 

After the fall of the Commune, Valentin's former comrade Julie Magot accused Valentin of being a very violent club member and of having threatened her husband, who was an official at the town hall. 
It is shameful. When we leave here, we must slit their throats and chop them up like pig meat." 
Valentin was not the only woman to brandish her weapon at the podium to intimidate or reinforce her words; Julie Magot was also accused of doing so, and Louise Michel testified to it in 1898 in her Souvenirs. 

Illustration by Bertall 
In the portrait series , by the illustrator Bertall published in 1871, 
there is an illustration entitled La Colonelle, which the biographical dictionary Le Maitron compares to "Colonel Valentin". 
She is dressed in the uniform of an officer, with epaulettes and kepi, tight trousers, hair rolled up, and armed with a sabre. She stands between two men and a woman in gendered clothes who are sketched in the background. 
Her posture repeats elements of the poses of the woman and one of the men behind her, 
differs from that of another woman combatant in an illustration entitled La Barricade. Historian Gay L. Gullickson emphasizes that, while the communard woman in action has a clearly feminine figure, she has a shaggy and rough, even unsightly appearance, like the caricature of the "pétroleuses," and she is isolated. 
These framings illustrate the anti-communard point of view, 
about the social chaos that they supposed the Commune to be, in particular the base morals they attributed to revolutionary women.

References

References

Bibliography
 
 
 
 
 
 
 
 
 
 
 

Missing people
12th arrondissement of Paris
Colonels (military rank)
Communards
Women soldiers
French socialist feminists
French revolutionaries
People from Paris
19th-century French women politicians